The Jijili language, Tanjijili, also known as Ujijili, is a Plateau language of Nigeria. It is one of several languages which go by the ethnic name Koro.

References

Languages of Nigeria
South Plateau languages